Rehderodendron is a genus of five species of flowering plants in the family Styracaceae, native to southeastern Asia, from southwestern China south to Myanmar and Vietnam.

The genus name of Rehderodendron is in honour of Alfred Rehder (1863–1949), a German-American botanical taxonomist and dendrologist who worked at the Arnold Arboretum of Harvard University. It was first described and published in Sinensia Vol.2 on page 109 in 1932.

The species are small deciduous trees growing to 10–15 m tall.

Species
 Rehderodendron gongshanense Y.C.Tang
 Rehderodendron indochinense H.L.Li
 Rehderodendron kwangtungense Chun
 Rehderodendron kweichowense Hu
 Rehderodendron macrocarpum Hu
 Rehderodendron truongsonense Zhao, Wan-Yi, Fritsch, Peter W., Do, Van Truong, Fan, Qiang

Fossil record
40 fossil endocarps of †Rehderodendron custodum from the early Miocene, have been found in the Kristina Mine at Hrádek nad Nisou in North Bohemia, the Czech Republic.

References

Styracaceae
Ericales genera
Taxonomy articles created by Polbot
Plants described in 1932
Flora of Bangladesh
Flora of South-Central China
Flora of Southeast China
Flora of Myanmar
Flora of Vietnam